Decie  is a village in the administrative district of Gmina Korytnica, within Węgrów County, Masovian Voivodeship, in east-central Poland.

The village has a population of 49.

In the years 1975-1998, the town administratively belonged to the Siedlce Voivodeship.

References

Decie